New Mexico's 3rd congressional district serves the northern half of New Mexico, including the state's Capital, Santa Fe. The district has a significant Native American presence, encompassing most of the New Mexico portion of the Navajo Nation, situated in the northwest corner of the state, and most of the Puebloan peoples reservations. The current Representative is Democrat Teresa Leger Fernandez.

History
The district was created as a result of the redistricting cycle after the 1980 Census. Ben Ray Luján, who was elected to the seat in 2008, ran successfully for the United States Senate in 2020, leaving the seat open. Democratic nominee Teresa Leger Fernandez defeated Republican Alexis Johnson in the 2020 general election.

Historical district boundaries

Recent results from statewide races 
Results Under Current Lines (Since 2023)

Results Under Old Lines (2013-2023)

Results Under Old Lines (2003-2013)

List of members representing the district

Election results

1982

1984

1986

1988

1990

1992

1994

1996

1997 (Special)

1998

2000

2002

2004

2006

2008

2010

2012

2014

2016

2018

2020

2022

See also

New Mexico's congressional districts
List of United States congressional districts

References
 Congressional Biographical Directory of the United States 1774–present

03
Navajo Nation